The Ruotsinsalmi-class minelayers were a two-strong class of minelayers in the Finnish Navy.
were constructed in Finland and saw service in the Winter War and World War II. Riihahti was sunk in an engagement with Soviet motor torpedo boats on 23 August 1943. Ruotsinsalmi survived the wars and remained in service in the post war Finnish Navy until being withdrawn in the 1970s.

Design and description
By the late-1930s, the Finnish Navy was focused on defence of the nation and the only ships under construction by Finland were the Ruotsinsalmi-class minelayers and assorted smaller craft. This was due to the majority of the defence budget being awarded to the Finnish Army. They had a complement of 60.

The ships were armed with one 50-calibre  guns, two Madsen  anti-aircraft cannon for anti-aircraft warfare. The vessels were also equipped with mine dropping rails, and could carry about 100 mines. Though not designed for anti-submarine warfare, the Ruotsinsalmi-class ships mounted two depth charge racks and two throwers.

Vessels of the class

Construction and career 
Both  and sister ship  were laid down in 1938, launched in 1940  and completed in 1941. The minelayers were active in the Winter War and again in World War II both times engaged with the Soviet Union. In July 1943, Soviet forces attempted a breakout into the Baltic Sea from where the Finns had them blockaded via the Seeigel-Rukajärvi mine barrage. There were a number of naval encounters in the Soviet attempt and Riihahti was sunk on 23 August 1943 in a battle with Soviet motor torpedo boats. Ruotsinsalmi survived the war and remained in the Finnish Navy even after the terms of the Paris Peace Treaty of 1947 that was signed following the end of World War II restricted the navy's operational capacities. In the post war era, Ruotsinsalmi was rearmed with two  guns and two 20 mm guns while retaining her minelaying capability. Moore and Westerlund & Chumbley claim the vessel was deleted in 1975 and Westerlund states the vessel was stricken in 1977.

Notes

Citations

References
 
 
 
 
 
 

Mine warfare vessels of the Finnish Navy
Mine warfare vessel classes
Ships built in Turku